Jørgen Watne Frydnes (born 1984) is a Norwegian administrator and politician.

Career
Frydnes has been CEO of Utøya AS since 2011. Utøya and Frydnes received the Fritt Ord Honorary Award in 2021.

In 2020 he was elected member of the Norwegian Nobel Committee for the period 2021–2026. He is a board member of the Norwegian Helsinki Committee.

References

1984 births
Living people
Norwegian politicians